Vladimir Ivanovich Larin (15 May 1948 – 18 October 1995) was a Russian professional footballer.

Club career
He made his professional debut in the Soviet Top League in 1967 for FC Lokomotiv Moscow.

Honours
 Soviet Top League runner-up: 1970.
 Soviet Cup winner: 1970.
 European Cup Winners' Cup 1971–72 finalist (1 game).

References

1948 births
Footballers from Moscow
1995 deaths
Russian footballers
Soviet footballers
Soviet Top League players
FC Lokomotiv Moscow players
FC Dynamo Moscow players
Association football forwards
Association football midfielders
FC Dynamo Vologda players